Ian McCulloch (born 28 July 1971) is an English former professional snooker player from Walton-Le-Dale, Preston, Lancashire. He is known for his ability to grind opponents down through protracted safety exchanges and disjointed breakbuilding. He compiled 105 century breaks in his career.

Career
McCulloch turned professional in 1992, and after steadily climbing up the rankings for many years, he reached the quarter-finals of a ranking event for the first time in the 1999 Welsh Open. He also made his debut in the Crucible stages of the 1999 World Championship.

Like Barry Pinches he entered his best form in his early 30s. He reached two ranking event finals – the 2002 British Open (losing to Paul Hunter) and the 2004 Grand Prix in his home town (losing to Ronnie O'Sullivan).

He beat David Gray to qualify for the 2003 World Championship in a clash between players who share their names with musicians, and went on to reach the quarter finals in 2004. He went one stage further in 2005, losing 14–17 to Matthew Stevens in the semi-final, beating Graeme Dott, Mark Williams and Alan McManus en route. He was ranked number 16 in the rankings in 2005/2006 season, which would normally guarantee a seeding in the ranking tournaments, but was unluckily pushed out by Shaun Murphy, who as the current world champion was not in top 16 of the rankings, and was seeded before him in tournaments.

His 2005–06 season proved disappointing, with a quarter-final appearance in the Welsh Open the highlight. He failed to qualify for the World Championship, losing to Dave Harold, causing him to drop down the rankings. He made his first appearance as a BBC pundit during the tournament.

An improved 2006–07 campaign included a quarter-final run in the Grand Prix. He qualified for the World Championship, and in the first round he eliminated defending champion Graeme Dott 10–7, but he lost in the second round 8–13 to Anthony Hamilton.

In the 2007 UK Championship he also knocked out the defending champion, by coming from 0–5 down against Peter Ebdon to beat him 9–8 in a remarkable comeback. He lost to Stephen Maguire 5–9 in the last 16. He missed out on the 2008 World Championship after losing 5–10 to eventual quarter-finalist, Liang Wenbo.

The 2008–09 season was a struggle, with only two wins in the first five tournaments. He failed to qualify for the World Championship again, losing to Rory McLeod despite scoring three centuries. After the 2011/12 season, he decided to quit the game for good after finishing number 68 in the world. This was in part motivated by an occupational shoulder injury. His best run was at the Welsh Open where he reached the final qualifying round before losing to Tom Ford 3–4.

On 11 October 2009, he won the Bodensee Open, although he was the only professional player taking part.

Broadcasting
McCulloch is a regular pundit for William Hill and can be heard in their shops previewing snooker tournaments and as a regular in-studio guest on their In-Play Radio service.

Performance and rankings timeline

Career finals

Ranking tournaments: 2

References

External links

Profile on Global Snooker
Profile on Yahoo! Sport

1971 births
Living people
English snooker players
People from Walton-le-Dale